Lipogramma trilineata, the three-lined basslet, is a species of ray-finned fish from the family Grammatidae. It is found in the western Atlantic Ocean from  the waters off southeastern Florida south through the Bahamas into the Gulf of Mexico and the Caribbean Sea  as well as the coasts of Central and South America from Quintana Roo, Mexico to Nicaragua, and the seas off Cartagena and those off Venezuela at Curaçao and Bonaire. It has been recorded that in the Bahamas, there has been a near two-thirds decline in the biomass of fish which lionfish prey on over a period of two years. Other species of basslet have been confirmed as prey for lionfishes.

Lipogramma trileaneata has an elongated, compressed body with a large eye and short snout, the mouth sits at the front of the head, and it has teeth on its jaws, vomer and palatine bone. The upper part of the head the back and the dorsal fin are yellow to reddish orange while the rest of the bos is bluish grey., the yellow colouration can cover the whole body. There are three black-edged blue lines, one along the centre of the snout, through the forehead and the nape and one on each side from the eye to beneath the front of the dorsal fin. There is a blue line along the margin of the dorsal fin and the other fins are a translucent blue.

References

Taxa named by John Ernest Randall 
Fish described in 1963
Grammatidae